Eduardo H. Garza (July 25, 1978) is a Mexican film director, screenwriter, producer and film editor who resides in Spain. He has worked in advertisement and some Mexican film sets. Garza started out as a technician and later became an assistant director. After settling down in Spain, he worked in the local advertisement industry fulfilling different roles. In 2013 H. Garza and his wife decided to self produce their first feature film Legionario.

Legionario 

Legionario, his first feature film, began shooting in 2014 and was finished in December 2016. The film was self-produced by him and his wife. Eduardo H. Garza wrote, directed, photographed, edited and did 80% of the visual effects compositing. Garza did this to finish the film as there was a very tight budget. The Spanish Army collaborated with the filmmaker by allowing him to shoot on Chinook helicopters and in some of their bases in Madrid. The rest of the military scenes in Afghanistan were shot in a paintball play zone in Spain.

The film is starred by upcoming Spanish actor . He accepted the role as he said that the character's emotional arc was something very interesting to do as an actor.

References

External links
 

1978 births
Living people
Mexican film directors
People from Monterrey